George W. Bingham was a member of the Wisconsin State Assembly. Bingham was born on April 6, 1860 in Friendship, Wisconsin. In 1888, he married Nellie A. Wilbur. He died on March 10, 1947.

Career
Bingham was a member of the Assembly during the 1911, 1913 and 1929 sessions. He was also president of Friendship, as well as County Treasurer, Sheriff and Chairman of the Republican Committee of Barron County, Wisconsin.

References

People from Barron County, Wisconsin
Republican Party members of the Wisconsin State Assembly
Mayors of places in Wisconsin
County treasurers in Wisconsin
Wisconsin sheriffs
1860 births
1947 deaths
People from Friendship, Wisconsin